Statistics of Swiss Super League in the 1954–55 season.

Overview
It was contested by 14 teams, and FC La Chaux-de-Fonds won the championship.

League standings

Results

Sources
 Switzerland 1954–55 at RSSSF

Swiss Football League seasons
Swiss
1954–55 in Swiss football